Cliven Sven James Loubser (born 24 February 1997) is a Namibian rugby union player for the n national team and for  in the Varsity Cup. His regular position is fly-half. He also plays for the Utah Warriors of Major League Rugby (MLR).

Rugby career
Loubser was born in Rehoboth.

References

External links
 
 

Namibian rugby union players
Living people
1997 births
People from Rehoboth, Namibia
Rugby union fly-halves
Namibia international rugby union players
Welwitschias players
Leeds Tykes players
Utah Warriors players